Lord John Edward FitzRoy (24 September 1785 – 28 December 1856), was a British politician.

Background and education
FitzRoy was the sixth son of Augustus FitzRoy, 3rd Duke of Grafton, Prime Minister of Great Britain, by his second wife Elizabeth Wrottesley, daughter of the Very Reverend Sir Richard Wrottesley, 7th Baronet, Dean of Worcester. He was the half-brother of George FitzRoy, 4th Duke of Grafton, and Lord Charles FitzRoy and the full brother of Admiral Lord William FitzRoy. He was educated at Harrow and Trinity College, Cambridge.

Public life
FitzRoy was returned to Parliament for Thetford in 1812 (succeeding his brother Lord William), a seat controlled by the FitzRoy family, and was a supporter of the Whig opposition. He was not re-elected in 1818 but returned to the House of Commons in 1820 as one of two representatives for Bury St Edmunds (succeeding his nephew Lord Euston), another seat controlled by the family. He continued to represent the constituency until 1826.

Personal life
FitzRoy never married. He died in December 1856, aged 71.

References

1785 births
1856 deaths
Younger sons of dukes
John
People educated at Harrow School
Alumni of Trinity College, Cambridge
Whig (British political party) MPs for English constituencies
UK MPs 1812–1818
UK MPs 1820–1826